Prudent Carpentier (March 13, 1922 – March 22, 2019) was a politician from Quebec, Canada.  He was a Member of the National Assembly (MNA).

Background

He was born on March 13, 1922, in Saint-Tite, Mauricie and worked in forestry.

Political career

Carpentier ran as a Liberal candidate in the district of Laviolette in 1970, and won.  He succeeded Union Nationale incumbent André Leduc.

In 1976 though, he was defeated by Parti Québécois candidate Jean-Pierre Jolivet.

References

1922 births
2019 deaths
Quebec Liberal Party MNAs
French Quebecers